Giacomo Crispo or Jacopo Crispo may refer to:

Giacomo I Crispo (d. 1418), Duke of the Archipelago from 1397 to 1418
Giacomo II Crispo (d. 1447), Duke of the Archipelago from 1433 to 1447
Giacomo III Crispo (d. 1480), Duke of the Archipelago from 1463 to 1480
Giacomo IV Crispo (d. 1576), Duke of the Archipelago from 1564 to 1566
Giacomo Crispo, Governor of the Duchy of the Archipelago (d. 1505), ruled briefly in 1494

See also
Gian Giacomo Crispo